Gary Stephens (23 August 1952) is an English former professional rugby league footballer who played in the 1960s, 1970s and 1980s as a , and coached in the 1980s and 1990s.

He played at representative level for Great Britain, England and Yorkshire, and at club level for Castleford, Manly-Warringah Sea Eagles, Wigan, Warrington, Leigh, Halifax and York. and coached at club level for Ryedale-York.

Playing career

Castleford
Stephens played  in the 7–11 defeat by Hull Kingston Rovers in the 1971–72 Yorkshire Cup Final during the 1971–72 season at Belle Vue, Wakefield on Saturday 21 August 1971, and was a substitute (replacing  Clive Pickerill) in the 17–7 victory over Featherstone Rovers in the 1977–78 Yorkshire Cup Final during the 1977–78 season at Headingley, Leeds on Saturday 15 October 1977.

Stephens played  in Castleford's 12–4 victory over Leigh in the 1976 BBC2 Floodlit Trophy Final during the 1976–77 season at Hilton Park, Leigh on Tuesday 14 December 1976.

Stephens played , was man of the match (jointly with Blackpool Borough's Howard Allen) and scored a try in Castleford's 25–15 victory over Blackpool Borough in the 1976–77 Player's No.6 Trophy Final during the 1976–77 season at The Willows, Salford on Saturday 22 January 1977.

Gary Stephens' Testimonial match at Castleford took place in 1980.

Manly-Warringah
In 1976 Gary Stephens and Manly-Warringah team mates Phil Lowe and Steve Norton became the third Englishmen to have played in a NSWRFL Grand Final-winning team following Dick Huddart (St. George in 1966), Dave Bolton (Balmain in 1969), and Mal Reilly (Manly in 1972 and 1973).

Wigan
Stephens was signed by Wigan for a fee of £35,000, and made his debut in November 1980 against Fulham.

Halifax
Stephens played  in Halifax's 19-18 victory over St. Helens in the 1986-87 Challenge Cup Final during the 1986–87 season at Wembley Stadium, London on Saturday 2 May 1987.

Representative honours
Stephens won a cap for England while at Castleford in 1979 against Wales, and won caps for Great Britain while at Castleford in 1979 against Australia (3 matches), and New Zealand (2 matches).

Stephens won caps for Yorkshire while at Castleford playing  in the 17-7 victory over Lancashire at Wigan's stadium on 20 December 1975, the 12-12 draw with Cumberland at Whitehaven's stadium on 15 February 1977, scoring 1-try in the 18-15 victory over Lancashire at Castleford's stadium  on 1 March 1977, the 7-23 defeat by Lancashire at Widnes' stadium on 27 September 1978, and the 16-19 defeat by Lancashire at Castleford's stadium on 12 September 1979.

RL Retirement
Gary Stephens' current occupation is a Caretaker/Bar Manager at West Riding County FA

References

External links
(archived by web.archive.org) Profile at thecastlefordtigers.co.uk
Profile at wigan.rlfans.com
(archived by web.archive.org) Statistics at wolvesplayers.thisiswarrington.co.uk

1952 births
Living people
Castleford Tigers players
England national rugby league team players
English rugby league coaches
English rugby league players
Great Britain national rugby league team players
Halifax R.L.F.C. players
Leigh Leopards players
Manly Warringah Sea Eagles players
Place of birth missing (living people)
Rugby league halfbacks
Rugby league players from Castleford
Warrington Wolves players
Wigan Warriors players
York Wasps coaches
York Wasps players
Yorkshire rugby league team players